Gaber Dobrovoljc (born 27 January 1993) is a Slovenian footballer who plays as a defender for Radomlje.

Notes

References

External links
NZS profile 

1993 births
Living people
Footballers from Ljubljana
Slovenian footballers
Association football defenders
NK Domžale players
Fatih Karagümrük S.K. footballers
Knattspyrnufélag Akureyrar players
NK Radomlje players
Slovenian PrvaLiga players
TFF First League players
Úrvalsdeild karla (football) players
Slovenian expatriate footballers
Expatriate footballers in Turkey
Slovenian expatriate sportspeople in Turkey
Expatriate footballers in Iceland
Slovenian expatriate sportspeople in Iceland
Slovenia youth international footballers
Slovenia under-21 international footballers